Marie Luc Arpin (born July 4, 1978) is a Canadian water polo player. She was born in Saint-Hyacinthe, Quebec and her home town is Saint-Lambert. and played water polo in Saint-Lambert from 1989 until 2005. She is a graduate of McGill University. She was part of the 5th place women's water polo team at the 2000 Summer Olympics, the 7th place women's water polo team at the 2004 Summer Olympics and the bronze medal winning women's water polo team at the 2001 world championships in Fukuoka, Japan.

See also
 Canada women's Olympic water polo team records and statistics
 List of World Aquatics Championships medalists in water polo

References

External links
 

1978 births
Living people
Canadian female water polo players
Water polo players at the 2000 Summer Olympics
Water polo players at the 2004 Summer Olympics
Olympic water polo players of Canada
Sportspeople from Saint-Hyacinthe
Water polo people from Quebec
French Quebecers
World Aquatics Championships medalists in water polo
Pan American Games silver medalists for Canada
Pan American Games medalists in water polo
Water polo players at the 2003 Pan American Games
People from Saint-Lambert, Quebec
Medalists at the 2003 Pan American Games